NPRA may refer to:

 National Petrochemical and Refiners Association
 The National Petroleum Reserve in Alaska
 Norwegian Public Roads Administration
 Natriuretic peptide receptor A, a type of atrial natriuretic peptide receptor